Elvis Pompilio (born 1961) is a Belgian fashion designer who specialises in hats. He was born in Liège to a family of Italian origin.

Pompilio entered business in 1987, with a workshop in Brussels where he produced designs for use in fashion shows by marques such as Dior and Valentino. In 1990, he opened a retail store in central Brussels. He later opened a store in Antwerp, followed by branches in Paris and London. His designs are sold in the United States and Japan.

Pompilio was a nominee on the RTBF show Le plus grand Belge (The Greatest Belgian) in 2005, finishing in 84th place.

Further reading

 Wauters, Laurence, Elvis Pompilio: Contrastes et Créations. Éditions Luc Pire, 2004.
 Witkowska, Barbara & Brandajs, Laurent, Stylistes chez eux. Éditions Racine, 2006.

External links
 Interview with Elvis Pompilio by Laurent Depré, La Derniere Heure, 25 March 2002
 Company website

Living people
Belgian people of Italian descent
1961 births
Belgian fashion designers
Belgian businesspeople
Milliners